Jabana is a suburb of Kigali, the capital of Rwanda.

Kigali